Khan Asparukh was the largest Bulgarian tanker owned and operated by Navibulgar.

She a 100,000-tonne capacity. The ship began construction in 1974 in Varna shipyard. It was built according to a project of the Shipbuilding Institute in the city of Varna with the chief designer engineer Tasho Popov. The first 100,000-tonne tanker built in Bulgaria was launched on March 24, 1976. The first captain and chief mechanic, respectively: Vidyo Videv and Peter Tsaperkov.

The tanker was a part of the Navibulgar until December 3, 2003, when it was sold for scrapping in Alang, India.

References 

Tankers
1976 ships
Ships of Bulgaria
Ships built in Bulgaria